Style Design College is a design higher education institution located in the historic centre of Milan. The institution offers undergraduate courses that are permitted by local Italian law and issues internationally recognised qualifications by the IARC. However it is not recognised by the International Association of Universities' Worldwide Database
of Higher Education Institutions, Systems and Credentials, the official worldwide standard.

External links
 Not up to worldwide standard, Search: Style Design College

Fashion schools
Education in Milan
Italian fashion